Harry Jönsson (born 28 November 1943) is a Swedish former footballer who played the majority of his career at Malmö FF as a forward.

References

1943 births
Association football forwards
Swedish footballers
Allsvenskan players
Malmö FF players
Living people